Raffi Quirke (born 18 August 2001) is an English professional rugby union player who plays as a scrum-half for Sale Sharks in the Premiership.

Early life
Raffi Quirke was born on 18 August 2001 in Chorlton. He started playing rugby when he was 5, inspired by his father Saul who coached him through his early years. He was part of a Broughton Park RFC side at U9s level, in which the side went unbeaten while scoring 267 tries. Quirke was also a triathlete, following in the footsteps of both of his parents, becoming North-West champion at triathlon when 12 or 13. However, it became increasingly difficult to consider pursuing both rugby and triathlons to a professional level, so he eventually decided to focus on rugby.

He was educated at Saint Ambrose College. Quirke of Irish ancestry through a maternal grandparent.

Club career
In 2019 Quirke spent a period on loan to Sale FC in National League One. On 20 February 2021 Quirke made his professional club debut for Sale Sharks in a Premiership game against Harlequins and in April of that year he scored his first try for the club in a European Rugby Champions Cup game away to Scarlets.

International career
Quirke represented England at both U16 and U18 level, scoring two tries against Wales for the under-16 squad. In 2018 he toured South Africa with the under-18 squad and scored a try in the defeat against France. Quirke was subsequently selected for the under-20 squad although did not participate in any of their fixtures.

In September 2021 coach Eddie Jones included Quirke in the senior England squad for a training camp. On 13 November 2021 Quirke made his Test debut for England, coming on as a replacement for Ben Youngs in the 72nd minute against Australia in the Autumn Nations Series, a game which England won 32-15. In doing so, he became England's youngest scrum-half since Nick Duncombe in 2002. Quirke then came off the bench in England's final test of the series against South Africa, scoring the winning try in England's 27-26 victory.

Quirke was named in the initial training squad for the 2022 Six Nations Championship.

International tries

Personal life
As a keen outdoors sports fan, Quirke also enjoys middle-distance running, cross country running, swimming, and cycling. In his music tastes, Raffi enjoys hip-hop, Rhythm and Blues, reggae and rock, with his favourite artist being Bob Marley. Raffi is also a fan of Manchester United. He returns to Saint Ambrose to help coach the younger players.

References

External links
Sale Sharks Profile
ESPN Profile
Ultimate Rugby Profile

2001 births
Living people
English rugby union players
England international rugby union players
Rugby union players from Chorlton-cum-Hardy
Sale Sharks players
Rugby union scrum-halves
English people of Irish descent
People educated at St. Ambrose College